Jordan is an unincorporated community in Morgan Township, Owen County, in the U.S. state of Indiana.

History
An old variant name is Jordan Village. A post office was established under the name Jordan Village in 1854, and remained in operation until 1922. According to Ronald L. Baker, the community was probably named after the Jordan family of settlers. An older volume of local history states the nearby Jordan Creek was named after the Jordan River in West Asia.

Geography

References

Unincorporated communities in Indiana
Unincorporated communities in Owen County, Indiana